Red-bellied pitta has been split into the following species:
 Philippine pitta, Erythropitta erythrogaster
 Sula pitta, Erythropitta dohertyi
 Sulawesi pitta, Erythropitta celebensis
 Siau pitta, Erythropitta palliceps
 Sangihe pitta, Erythropitta caeruleitorques
 South Moluccan pitta, Erythropitta rubrinucha
 North Moluccan pitta, Erythropitta rufiventris
 Louisiade pitta, Erythropitta meeki
 Bismarck pitta, Erythropitta novaehibernicae
 Papuan pitta, Erythropitta macklotii

Birds by common name